Isaac Stephenson (June 18, 1829March 15, 1918) was an American politician of the Republican Party who represented Wisconsin as both a United States representative and a United States senator.

He was born in the community of Yorkton, near Fredericton in the colony of New Brunswick (now in Canada, but a British colony at the time). His parents were Isaac Stephenson (1791–1874), a lumberman and farmer born in Ireland of Scotch-Irish ancestry, and Elizabeth (Watson) Stephenson (1793–1838), who was born in London.

Lumberman
Stephenson worked in lumbering activities in the eastern U.S. for several years, principally in Maine, close to Canada. In 1845 he moved to Wisconsin, where for a time he managed absentee timber properties, but soon entered the lumber business for himself.

In 1858 he settled permanently in Marinette, where he steadily expanded his lumbering operations, especially during the Civil War. Although Stephenson suffered heavy losses in the Peshtigo Fire of 1871, he recouped. He was one of the wealthiest lumbermen in the Great Lakes area, with real-estate holdings in Marinette, Green Bay, Milwaukee, and the booming town of Chicago, and throughout the Great Lakes. He also owned vast acreages of pine lands in northern Wisconsin and Michigan which were yet to be harvested.

Political career

Stephenson joined the Republican Party, which was popular among his class in the northern tier of states. His wealth and economic power made him a powerful figure in local and state politics. He was elected to several offices, including town supervisor, county board chairman, and justice of the peace.

Next Stephenson was elected as a member of the Wisconsin State Assembly (1866, 1868). In 1882, he was elected to the Forty-Eighth Congress, and then reelected to the Forty-Ninth and Fiftieth Congresses (serving March 4, 1883 – March 3, 1889). He represented Wisconsin's newly created 9th congressional district. He was not a candidate for re-election in 1888. In 1899 he was unsuccessful in his bid to win election through the state legislature as a United States senator from Wisconsin (as was the process at the time).

Early Progressive leader
In 1900 he threw his support and substantial financial backing behind Robert M. La Follette, Sr., in his successful campaign for the Wisconsin governorship, and for a number of years was a prominent adviser to the Progressive faction of the Republican party, and a liberal contributor to its campaign funds. In the 1904 progressive-stalwart split, Stephenson was chosen by the "gymnasium convention" as one of the progressive delegates to the Republican national convention along with La Follette and William D. Connor. Although the national convention refused to accept the credentials of the Progressive delegation, the La Follette forces were recognized as the legal Republican ticket by the Wisconsin Supreme Court (1904).

In 1901 Stephenson established the Milwaukee Free Press, providing Progressive-Republicans with a metropolitan newspaper, and competition for the Stalwart-controlled Milwaukee Sentinel. In 1907 Stephenson sought the U.S. Senate seat made vacant by the resignation of John C. Spooner and, after a brief deadlock, was elected by the Progressive-controlled state legislature. In 1908 he ran for renomination in the Republican primary, was opposed by La Follette, but despite this opposition won the nomination through the aid of the state chairman of the Republican party William D. Connor and lavish use of his personal wealth, and was re-elected by the legislature in 1909. Although his election was twice blocked by fraud investigations in both the state legislature and the U.S. Senate, Stephenson was eventually vindicated and resumed his seat in the Senate, serving from May 1907, to March 1915.

Stephenson holds the distinction of being the oldest elected freshman United States Senator; he was 77 when he took office.

Stephenson is the last senator from Wisconsin's Class 3 senate seat to have retired from the senate. Paul Husting, Stephenson's successor, died in office and every senator after Husting was defeated for reelection, either through defeat for renomination or in the general election.

Presidential cow
In 1909 Stephenson purchased a prized Holstein cow as a gift for the 27th President of the United States, William Howard Taft. The cow was named Pauline Wayne and she became the last presidential pet cow. Pauline Wayne lived and grazed on the White House lawn.

Retirement
He published his memoir in 1915 titled Recollections of a Long Life. After returning from Washington in 1915, Stephenson retired to his home in Marinette, where he remained until his death on March 15, 1918. Noted for his local philanthropies in Marinette, a park, street, and memorial library are named in his honor. The town of Stephenson, Wisconsin is also named in his honor.

His younger brother, Samuel Merritt Stephenson, served as a U.S. Representative from Michigan.

See also
 List of United States senators born outside the United States

References

Dictionary of  American Biography
Wisconsin Blue Book (1911)

Further reading
 Maxwell, Robert S. La Follette and the Rise of the Progressives in Wisconsin. Madison: State Historical Society of Wisconsin, 1956.

}

1829 births
1918 deaths
Businesspeople in timber
Pre-Confederation Canadian emigrants to the United States
Republican Party members of the Wisconsin State Assembly
Wisconsin state court judges
People from Marinette, Wisconsin
People from York County, New Brunswick
Republican Party United States senators from Wisconsin
Republican Party members of the United States House of Representatives from Wisconsin
Businesspeople from Wisconsin
19th-century American politicians
20th-century American politicians
19th-century American businesspeople
19th-century American judges